Albert Smith (January 3, 1793 – May 29, 1867) was a U.S. Representative from Maine.

Born in Hanover, Massachusetts, Smith attended the common schools and was graduated from Brown University, Providence, Rhode Island, in 1813.  He studied law, was admitted to the bar, and commenced practice in Portland, Maine, in 1817.  He served as member of the Maine House of Representatives in 1820.  He was United States Marshal for the district of Maine 1830–1838.

Smith was elected as a Democrat to the Twenty-sixth Congress (March 4, 1839 – March 3, 1841).  He was an unsuccessful candidate for reelection in 1840 to the Twenty-seventh Congress.  He died in Boston, Massachusetts, on May 29, 1867.  He was interred in Mount Auburn Cemetery, Cambridge, Massachusetts.

References

External links

 

1793 births
1867 deaths
Brown University alumni
Maine lawyers
United States Marshals
Democratic Party members of the Maine House of Representatives
People from Hanover, Massachusetts
Politicians from Portland, Maine
Burials at Mount Auburn Cemetery
Democratic Party members of the United States House of Representatives from Maine
19th-century American politicians
19th-century American lawyers